Johan Rutger Gunnarsson (12 February 1946 – 30 April 2015) was a Swedish musician, bass guitarist, guitarist, arranger and producer. He was closely associated with the pop group ABBA.

Career
Gunnarsson grew up in Ledberg parish. His career began with Björn Ulvaeus in the Hootenanny Singers. He went on to work with ABBA, playing on all their albums and participating in their tours. He later worked on several musicals and musical events, including: Chess, Les Misérables, Rhapsody In Rock, 007, Mamma Mia! and Diggiloo. Gunnarsson also arranged strings and played bass for others, including Celine Dion, Westlife, Elton John, Lee Hazlewood, Adam Ant, and Bobbysocks. He produced and arranged music for artists such as Gwen Stefani, Elin Lanto, Joyride, and Alla Pugacheva.

References

External links

This article was initially translated from the Swedish Wikipedia article.
Anders Hanser: Rutger Gunnarsson. Bass Player, December 2000, p. 18

1946 births
2015 deaths
Eurovision Song Contest conductors
People from Linköping
Swedish bass guitarists
Swedish male musicians
Swedish music arrangers
Swedish record producers